Beiseker  is a village in the Canadian province of Alberta, approximately  northeast of Calgary.  It is considered to be an outermost part of the Calgary Region, and is included within Calgary's Census Metropolitan Area (CMA). The village is surrounded by rural Rocky View County, and the closest neighbouring communities are Irricana, Kathyrn, and Acme.

History
Lying in a belt of rich black soil, Beiseker was developed as an agricultural service centre. It was founded by the Calgary Colonization Company, whose purpose was to promote settlement by demonstrating the grain-growing potential of the area. The village's name came from Thomas Lincoln Beiseker (1866-1941), a partner and vice president of the company. Initial colonization took place in 1908 when the company recruited a number of ethnic German settlers from the Great Plains of the Dakotas.  This is reflected in the number of German family names which predominate the area.

The village began to grow in 1910 when the branch line of the Canadian Pacific Railway was completed. In 1910, the first general store was opened in a large two-story building which housed the school and dance hall.  The Grand Trunk Pacific line - now owned by Canadian National Railway - was constructed in 1912 to the east of the central business district. Telephone arrived in 1912 and electricity in 1928. With the construction and intersection of Highways 9, 72 and 806 at the northeast edge of the village, Beiseker came to have a very favourable location in terms of road and rail access. Since it is located almost equidistant from Calgary and Drumheller, Beiseker began to emerge as a local service and trade centre for the surrounding rural agricultural area. Village status was achieved in 1921.

The surrounding area's great potential for grain-growing is shown by Beiseker's status as "World Wheat King Capital", or as a top producing area of wheat.

Infrastructure

Beiseker Community School is located in the village. It is part of the Rocky View Schools system, and teaches from kindergarten to grade 12.

The village is also home to Baptist, Catholic and Anglican congregations.  As Beiseker is at the intersection of three provincial highways, and equipped with a campground and motel, it is a popular stop for campers and other travellers coming to and from Saskatoon and Drumheller.  There is also a small airport which serves the community, located a five kilometres east of town along Alberta Highway 9.

Economy
Beiseker currently serves as a centre for local agricultural services including fertilizer, seed cleaning, and soil testing.  There is a local UFA outlet, and a Canadian Malting Co. grain elevator serving farmers in the area.  Local industries serve the oilpatch, and there are many sites extracting natural gas in the immediate area surrounding Beiseker, as well as several major pipelines.

Beiseker also has a number of small businesses on its main street offering a variety of services, including a local credit union, grocery store, pharmacist and hair dressers, as well as several small restaurants.

The Canadian office of Lampson International, a large international company specializing in construction cranes, is based in Beiseker.

Notable people
William Samuel McGee (b 1868, Lindsay, Ontario - d 1940, Beiseker) lived for several years on a farm with his wife and daughter just outside Beiseker and is buried in the area. His name was to be the inspiration for the poem The Cremation of Sam McGee by Robert W. Service.

Arts and culture
Several locations in and around Beiseker were featured in the filming of Ang Lee's Academy Award-winning film Brokeback Mountain, including the site of the 'Twist Ranch' that figures importantly in the penultimate scene of the film.

In 2016, Beiseker was selected as a filming location for the third season of FX Network's show Fargo, as well as an episode of TBS's series The Detour.  In 2018, Beiseker hosted the production for the Netflix series Black Summer.  In 2019, Beiseker hosted on-location shooting for Ghostbusters: Afterlife.

Mascot
In the early 1990s, the Village of Beiseker began promoting itself with the mascot, "Squirt the Skunk", which included promotional items such as pins and postcards. A "Squirt the Skunk" statue,  in height, was erected in the campground near Highway 72. In addition, a "Squirt the Skunk" costume was made so the mascot may appear at village events.

Demographics

In the 2016 Census of Population conducted by Statistics Canada, the Village of Beiseker recorded a population of 819 living in 331 of its 338 total private dwellings, a  change from its 2011 population of 785.

See also 
List of communities in Alberta
List of villages in Alberta

References

External links 

1921 establishments in Alberta
Calgary Region
Rocky View County
Villages in Alberta